In human anatomy, the esophageal hiatus is an opening in the diaphragm through which the esophagus and the vagus nerve pass.

Structure 
It is located in the right crus, one of the two tendinous structures that connect the diaphragm to the spine. Fibers of the right crus cross one another below the hiatus.

It is located approximately at level of the tenth thoracic vertebra (T10) and the 8th or 9th intercostal spaces.

The esophageal hiatus is situated in the muscular part of the diaphragm at the level of the tenth thoracic vertebra, and is elliptical in shape. It is placed superior, anterior, and slightly left of the aortic hiatus, and transmits the esophagus, the vagus nerve, the left inferior phrenic vessels, and some small esophageal arteries from left gastric vessels. The right crus of the diaphragm loops around forming a sling around the esophagus. Upon inspiration, this sling would constrict the esophagus, forming a functional (not anatomical) sphincter that prevents stomach contents from refluxing up the esophagus when intra-abdominal pressure rises during inspiration.

Clinical significance 
Hiatal hernia occurs when part of the stomach passes through the esophageal hiatus.

See also
 Hiatus hernia

References

External links
  - "Major Openings in the Diaphragm"

Thoracic diaphragm